The Royal Swazi Sun Classic was a golf tournament on the Sunshine Tour in the late 1990s and early 2000s. It was played at the Royal Swazi Sun Country Club in Swaziland. This is not to be confused with the Investec Royal Swazi Open, another Sunshine Tour event in Swaziland also played at the same course.

Winners

References

Former Sunshine Tour events
Golf tournaments in Eswatini